Claude Strebelle (2 February 1917 – 16 November 2010) was an architect and Belgian town planner, graduate of the Académie Royale des Beaux-Arts in Brussels in 1941.

1917 births
2010 deaths
Architects from Brussels
Académie Royale des Beaux-Arts alumni